The 1911 FA Cup final was the 40th FA Cup final. It was contested by Bradford City and Newcastle United. The first game resulted in a goalless draw at Crystal Palace. A single goal scored by Jimmy Speirs for Bradford won the replay at Old Trafford.

Route to the final

Match summary

Newcastle were defending the cup they had won the year before by defeating Barnsley 2–0. They faced a Bradford City side who had earned their highest position in the league. Newcastle's preparations were upset by long-term injuries to England international centre-forward Albert Shepherd and Peter McWilliam. Bradford's team showed just one surprise with Scottish centre-half Willie Gildea drafted in for just his 10th game for the club.

The first match at Crystal Palace ended goalless after 90 minutes, meaning for the second successive year the final went to a replay. City made one change to their team for the replay with Bob Torrance coming in for Gildea, who never played for City again. Newcastle's team remained unchanged. The replay, which took place at Old Trafford, was settled by a single goal for Bradford, a header scored by captain Jimmy Speirs.

It was a new trophy that Speirs lifted, appropriately made by Bradford jewellers Fattorini's. The cup triumph remains Bradford's only major honour.

Match details

Replay

References

External links 
Match report at www.fa-cupfinals.co.uk
1911 FA Cup winners...
FA Cup Final kits

1911
FA Cup
Bradford City A.F.C. matches
Newcastle United F.C. matches
April 1911 sports events
1911 sports events in London